Fahil is a town in central Syria, administratively part of the Homs Governorate, northwest of Homs. Nearby localities include Taldou and Kafr Laha to the northeast and al-Qabu to the west. According to the Central Bureau of Statistics (CBS), Fahil had a population of 5,775 in the 2004 census. Its inhabitants are predominantly Alawites and Greek Orthodox Christians.

References

Bibliography

 

Populated places in Homs District
Alawite communities in Syria
Eastern Orthodox Christian communities in Syria